The GEICO Cavemen are trademarked characters of the auto insurance company GEICO, used in a series of television advertisements that aired beginning in 2004. The campaign was created by Joe Lawson and Noel Ritter while working at The Martin Agency. According to an episode of the public radio show 99% Invisible, "It's so easy a caveman could do it" was first coined by Ritter. The inspiration for the campaign came from "Pastoralia", a short story by George Saunders, which revolves around a man and a woman, who work as "cave-people" for a failing theme park. In 2004, GEICO began an advertising campaign featuring Neanderthal-like cavemen in a modern setting. The premise of the commercials is that using GEICO's website is "so easy, a caveman could do it"; and that this slogan offends several cavemen, who not only still exist in modern society but live as intelligent, urbane bachelors. The first three GEICO commercials to feature cavemen were "Apartment", "Apology", and "Boom Mic".

Jeff Daniel Phillips and Ben Weber played the two earliest cavemen and continuously reprise their roles. Actor John Lehr appears most frequently as the caveman, while Ben Wilson has also portrayed one of the characters. The makeup effects for the cavemen include facial prosthetics, dental veneers, lace hairpieces, and body hair.  They were designed and created by Tony Gardner and his special effects company Alterian, Inc. In an online interview with Esquire, Joe Lawson said that one aspect of the ads is a critique of modern political correctness. The cavemen have been honored by the Madison Avenue Advertising Walk of Fame. The ABC TV show Cavemen is based on the commercials.

Television advertisements
 As a fake, caveman-insensitive commercial is being filmed, the boom operator turns out to be a Neanderthal caveman who stops the filming and yells "Not cool!"
 Two cavemen in their apartment watch the ad from commercial #1 on TV and take offense at its condescending tone, as it makes cavemen seem less intelligent.
 A spokesman meets with two cavemen in a restaurant to apologize for the promotion, explaining that "we had no idea you guys were still around." One of the cavemen tells the waiter, "I'll have the roast duck with the mango salsa." Considered a subtle jab at AFLAC for its duck mascot (AFLAC once televised a humorous commercial; having duck served in an Asian restaurant to potential buyers of the insurance programs). The other caveman informs the waiter that "I don't have much of an appetite, thank you."
 A caveman on a moving sidewalk at an airport spots a GEICO billboard featuring an overly silly representation of a caveman, along with the insulting phrase.
 A follow-up to the fourth commercial shows the same caveman talking on his cell phone, complaining about the offending billboard, saying "I'm looking right at it!".
 A caveman in a psychotherapy session complains to his therapist, played by Talia Shire, about GEICO's attitude towards cavemen. The therapist says that an ad saying "So easy a therapist could do it" would not make sense to her.
 Continuing the therapy session, the therapist says "No one said it was going to be easy." The caveman replies that if Geico had taken that attitude, "I wouldn't be having an existential meltdown right now." Another concurrent psychotherapy commercial has the caveman role-playing with a stuffed caveman doll. He says, "He's just a doll!"
 All three cavemen are at a high-rise-apartment party. On the balcony, two of them discuss one caveman's decision to purchase GEICO's insurance because of its low price. The second caveman does not entirely fault him, but states that "a little loyalty would be nice" in their opposition to the company. During their discussion, the third caveman interrupts from inside, exclaiming excitedly "Tina's here; we're getting back together!" The first caveman quickly snaps at him, exclaiming, "Hey! Give us a minute!"
 A caveman on a news-type talk show debates a human expert about whether or not cavemen "have failed to adapt." The expert insults the caveman by saying "It looks like someone woke up on the wrong side of the rock."
 A continuation to the 9th commercial, the woman on the bottom right says that ego in our society is at the forefront. The man on the left asks the caveman, "Response?". The caveman's response is "Uhhhh, what?!?!"
 The cavemen watch the show Cavemen, and ridicule the series. This ad premiered during Super Bowl XLII; the show itself had already been cancelled.
 A caveman dances in various styles in a rather ridiculous manner, remarking how hard it is to dance in such a style, making such exclamations as "GEICO probably thinks this is easy, too!"
 "Match": Focusing on GEICO's sports marketing efforts, a caveman faces Billie Jean King in a tennis match. The caveman is winning handily, but when he looks at the scoreboard, he realizes that it shows him losing 0-6, 0-6, 0-5. He does not understand, until he realizes the tournament is sponsored by GEICO. Feeling set up and humiliated by GEICO, he stands up and says "I get it! I quit, but I get it!" He then notices the chair he was just sitting in also bears a bold GEICO logo.
 "Plane Banner": A caveman and his girlfriend arrive at the beach. As the lady begins to disrobe, revealing her bikini, a plane flies by with a GEICO banner. The distraught caveman takes his sunglasses off and says "I'll be in the car".
 "Walkin'": Two cavemen ride up to an outdoor bar on motorcycles. At the bar, they see two typically beautiful girls who are clearly impressed by the bikers. The bikers then see a billboard similar to the one in ad #4 (although, since this ad targets motorcycle insurance, the caveman is on a motorcycle). They suddenly lose interest in the women, heading back to their bikes; the women seem confused by the sudden change in the cavemen's demeanor. The song "Hurt You" by The Sounds plays in the background.
 "Number 1 Fan": A caveman is shown on a Jumbotron at a basketball game as the "GEICO Ultimate Fan." He rejects the congratulations of those sitting around him, although he just won court-side seats. As the commercial ends, the arena announcer plugs GEICO, using the "so easy" phrase.
 "Metal Detector": A caveman is walking on the beach with his girlfriend, looking for treasure with a metal detector. The device beeps, exciting the couple. The caveman digs into the sand with a net and pulls out a set of car keys with a GEICO key chain attached. He throws the keys and metal detector on the ground and walks away in disgust.
 "Breaking Point": A caveman who is dressed as a caricature of Modern Man sees an advertisement for GEICO on many televisions through a window and cannot take it anymore; he takes off his glasses, unties his ponytail, and takes off his coat, and runs away acting like his former caveman-self set to "Let Me Be Myself" by 3 Doors Down.  This scene was used in part for the music video of the same song.
 "Bowling": A continuation of the 18th commercial. The caveman comes across a bowling alley, sees two of his caveman buddies there, and joins their game. The caveman who just came in went first, and one of his buddies went second. While the second caveman's pin sweeper is sweeping the pins, it shows on the pin sweeper an advertisement for GEICO with the "So easy" phrase, along with the GEICO logo on the pinsetter. This was also set to "Let Me Be Myself" by 3 Doors Down.  This video served as the ending to the music video of the same song.
 "Glovebox": This is a commercial for a GEICO iPhone App called "Glovebox" which is demonstrated by a hand model (with an unusually hairy hand). The end of the commercial's script states the app is "So Easy a Caveman Can Do It," which angers the hand model, who is revealed to be a caveman as he storms off, saying, "Where's my coat? It was suede, with the fringe!"
 "Fire": Part of a separate series of GEICO commercials where in which actor Mike McGlone walks into an empty room and asks a rhetorical and/or obvious question. In the commercial, his question is "Could switching to GEICO really save you 15% or more on car insurance? Did the cavemen invent fire?" The scene then cuts to one of the cavemen on a bed reading with a woman, he looks at the camera and sighs, then picks up his remote and turns his fireplace on.
 " 'Neanderthal' Brian Orakpo": Brian Orakpo plays Scrabble with a caveman. The two take turns putting down words before the game takes a turn for the worse for the caveman. The caveman gets agitated when Orakpo places "Neanderthal" on the board, before storming off in disgust after Orakpo places "GEICO" on the board.

Also, at the time of the launch of the Caveman's Crib website, a short advertisement featuring all cavemen at the "hip party" featured on the website was added after every caveman commercial that was currently airing.

In 2010, one of the cavemen was spotted filming a series of commercials in Homer, Alaska on the fishing boat FV Time Bandit from the television show The Deadliest Catch. During the shoot, the Mayor of the city presented the caveman with a key to the city. The shoot resulted in two commercials in which a caveman joined and served on the vessel titled "Luggage" and "Cook".

Television sitcom spin-off

On March 2, 2007, Variety reported that a sitcom based on the cavemen characters, simply titled Cavemen, was being developed for ABC.  The magazine reported, "'Cavemen' will revolve around three pre-historic men who must battle prejudice as they attempt to live as normal thirtysomethings in modern Atlanta." ABC announced this series for their fall schedule in May 2007. Originally it featured none of the cavemen from the commercials, but Jeff Daniel Phillips later agreed to join the cast.  It premiered on October 2, 2007. In the face of sagging ratings, it was quietly cancelled, automatically being the shortest-lived ABC sitcom of the season. In February 2008, a new series of Caveman commercials featured two of the characters spoofing the premise of the show.

See also
 Neanderthals in popular culture

References

External links
Geico Cavemen Fan Site - unofficial site
Advertising Industry critiques Caveman's Crib
GEICO Caveman Ads reviewed
Unofficial GEICO Cavemen FAQ and Definitive Video Post
 Trivia - Portrays one of the cavemen in the GEICO Insurance commercials
 Trivia - Portrays one of the "Cavemen" in the GEICO Insurance commercials

Advertising campaigns
Advertising characters
Male characters in advertising
Mascots introduced in 2004
Prehistoric people in popular culture
GEICO
Fiction about neanderthals